Truckers Against Trafficking (TAT) is a nonprofit organization that trains truck drivers to recognize and report instances of human trafficking. This national organization formed in Oklahoma, United States, in 2009 and teaches truck drivers about the results of human trafficking. TAT is based in Colorado and its executive director is Kendis Paris. 

TAT produces anti-trafficking materials which are commonly seen throughout the trucking industry.  They have teamed up with law enforcement agencies and trucking companies to provide training on identifying sex trafficking, and some companies require their drivers to go through it. Through their efforts, they have freed hundreds of human trafficking victims.  According to the National Human Trafficking Resource Center, the majority of truck drivers who report tips learned about them through TAT.

The organization began a partnership with Pilot Flying J in 2011 and the Truckload Carriers Association in 2013. In 2012, the Ottawa, Ontario, Canada-based Persons Against the Crime of Trafficking in Humans was inspired by TAT to initiate TruckSTOP, a campaign that teaches truck drivers how to identify human trafficking victims. TAT was promoted in "Killer Truckers", a 2013 television special by Investigation Discovery. Also in 2013, Nevada Attorney General Catherine Cortez Masto spoke highly of TAT at a forum hosted by Western States Propane. In one successful execution of TAT training, a truck driver called 9-1-1 after suspecting human trafficking in a particular situation, and his phone call precipitated the arrest and subsequent conviction of 31 traffickers, the release of nine people from the sex industry, and the fall of an organized crime ring that had been active in 13 U.S. states.

See also
Sex trafficking in the United States#Truck stops

References

American truck drivers
Human rights organizations based in the United States
Organizations that combat human trafficking
Non-profit organizations based in Colorado
Occupational organizations
Forced prostitution in the United States
Human trafficking in the United States
2009 establishments in Oklahoma
Organizations established in 2009
501(c)(3) organizations